Onion River may refer to a waterway in the United States:

Onion River (Minnesota)
Onion River, a tributary of the St. Regis River in New York
Onion River (Sheboygan River), a tributary of the Sheboygan River in Wisconsin
Onion River, a tributary of Lake Superior in Wisconsin
Onion River, Vermont

See also
Winooski River in Vermont, from the Abenaki word for "onion"